Mukhtar Ashrafi (Uzbek: Muxtor Ashrafiy; 
 in Bukhara – 10 December 1975 in Tashkent) was a Soviet Uzbek composer. He was named People's Artist of the USSR in 1951. He became a member of the Communist Party of the Soviet Union in 1941 was awarded the Stalin Prize in 1943 and 1952. He is known as the author of the first Uzbek opera “Buran” (together with Sergei Vasilenko) and the first Uzbek symphony.

His daughter Muqadamma was a noted medievalist.

Early life and education 
Mukhtar Ashrafi was born on 29 May (11 June) 1912 in Bukhara. He grew up in the family of his father, a famous Bukhara singer and musician Ashrafzhan Hafiza. At the age of seven, Ashrafi began to play Uzbek folk instruments improvising on the dutar. In 1924, he entered Oriental Music School in Bukhara. In 1928, Ashrafi graduated a dutar class in Bukhara and entered the Samarkand Institute of Music and Choreography.

From 1934 to 1936, he studied in a composition class of Sergei Vasilenko at the Moscow Conservatory. In 1934, Ashrafi wrote Komsomol and pioneer songs, and in 1935-1936, he wrote lyrical songs on the words of Ruzuli, working on his first opera at the same time.

Together with his teacher, Sergei Vasilenko, Ashrafi wrote the first Uzbek opera “Buran” that was staged in 1939, starting the history of Uzbek Opera and Ballet Theater.

In 1941-1944, Ashrafi studied composition at the Leningrad Conservatory. In 1948, he graduated from the conducting faculty of the Leningrad Conservatory as an external student.

Career 
In 1942, Ashrafi created the first Uzbek heroic symphony.

From 1943 to 1947, Ashrafi was a director of Alisher Navoi Uzbek Opera and Ballet Theater. Since 1944 Ashrafi was a teacher, and since 1953 - a professor at the Tashkent Conservatory.

In 1964-66 he was a director, artistic director and chief conductor of the Samarkand Opera and Ballet Theater, and since 1966 - a director, artistic director and chief conductor of the State Academic Bolshoi Theater of the Uzbek SSR in Tashkent.

From 1971 to 1975, Ashrafi was a rector of the Tashkent Conservatory.

Ashrafi is the author of the books "Indian Diaries" (in Russian and Uzbek), "Music in my life", numerous articles in magazines and periodicals.

Mukhtar Ashrafi died on 15 December 1975 in Tashkent. In 1976 Tashkent Conservatory was named after Ashrafi.

Awards and honors 
In 1937, Ashrafi was awarded a title of an Honored Artist of the Uzbek SSR. The same year he received an Order of the Badge of Honor (1937). In 1939 Ashrafi was awarded a title of the People’s Artist of Uzbek SSR, as well as his first Order of the Red Banner of Labor.

In 1943, for the "Heroic Symphony" he was awarded the second Stalin Prize degree (50,000 rubles), which he donated to the Defense Fund for the creation of an air squadron and a tank column.

In 1951, Ashrafi was awarded a title of the People’s Artist of the USSR. The same year he received his first Order of Lenin.

In 1952, he received Stalin Prize of the third degree for the cantata "Song about happiness". In 1959, Ashrafi was awarded his second Order of the Red Banner of Labor. His other awards include a Medal "In commemoration of the 100th anniversary of the birth of Vladimir Ilyich Lenin", a Medal "For valiant labor in the Great Patriotic War 1941-1945" and a State Prize of the Uzbek SSR named after Hamza (1970).

On the occasion of the 70th anniversary of Ashrafi, on 11 June 1982, a museum was opened in the house where he lived and worked from 1967 to 1975. In 2019, a memorial evening of Ashrafi was held in the assembly hall of the Union of Composers and Bastakors of Uzbekistan.

Selected works
Operas 
 Buran (1939, with S. Vasilenko)
 Grand Canal (1941, with S. Vasilenko)
 Dilaram (1958)
 Heart of a Poet (1962)

Ballets
 Love Amulet (1969)
 Timur Malik (1970)
 Stoikost''' (1971)
 Love and Dream (1973)

Orchestral works
 Symphony No. 1 "Heroic" (1942; awarded Stalin Prize)
 Symphony No. 2 "Glory to the Victors" (1944)
 Kantatu o Schast'ye (1952; awarded Stalin Prize)
 Oratorio Skazanie o Rustame'' (1974)
 Music for theater, films, etc.

References

1912 births
1975 deaths
20th-century classical composers
People from Bukhara
Communist Party of the Soviet Union members
Saint Petersburg Conservatory alumni
People's Artists of the USSR
Stalin Prize winners
Recipients of the Order of Lenin
Recipients of the Order of the Red Banner of Labour
Uzbekistani composers
Soviet composers
Soviet male composers
20th-century male musicians